Henry James Millar (died 1959) was an Irish rugby international. He won four caps between 1904 and 1905.

After his playing career he was President of the Leinster Branch of the IRFU in the 1922/23 season as well as President of the IRFU in the 1928/29 season.

References
Henry Millar at Scrum.com
IRFU Profile
Irish Rugby 1874 - 1999
Leinster Rugby : Past Presidents
Irish Rugby : Former Presidents 1874-1949

Year of birth missing
1959 deaths
Irish rugby union players
Ireland international rugby union players
Monkstown Football Club players
Rugby union locks